P. faba may refer to:
 Partula faba, a land snail species
 Pinnixa faba or mantle pea crab, a crab species